Life in Color is a 2015 American drama film starring Josh McDermitt and Katharine Emmer that had its world premiere at the 2015 South by Southwest film festival.

Plot
Mary, an unemployed nanny, and Homer, a struggling stand-up comedian, are stuck house-sitting together and reluctantly end up helping each other.

References

External links

2015 films
American independent films
American drama films
2015 drama films
2015 directorial debut films
2015 independent films
2010s English-language films
2010s American films